Universal Electronics Inc. (UEI) is an American smart home technology provider and manufacturer of universal remote controls, IoT devices such as voice-enabled smart home hubs, smart thermostats, home sensors; as well as a white label digital assistant platform optimized for smart home applications, and other software and cloud services for device discovery, fingerprinting and interoperability.  The company designs, develops, manufactures and ships products both under the "One For All" brand and as an OEM for other companies in the audio video, subscription broadcasting, connected home, tablet and smart phone markets. In 2015, it expanded its product and technology platform to include home automation, intelligent sensing and security.

UEI's global headquarters is located in Scottsdale, Arizona with R&D offices in Santa Ana, California, regional offices in Enschede (The Nederlands), Manaus (Brazil), Hong Kong, Bangalore (India), San Mateo and Carlsbad (California), and Twinsburg (Ohio).

In 2014 UEI was ranked 80 on Forbes' list of "America's Best Small Companies."

Many of UEI's products use different low power wireless technologies such as Bluetooth and Zigbee (or other 802.15.4 communications). UEI is a member of different wireless industry alliances such as Zigbee Alliance, Bluetooth SIG as well as Wi-Fi Alliance. UEI also offer SoCs such as UE878 and SDK to enable multi-protocol communication for different smart home devices such as leading Smart TVs.

Products
UEI is one of the world's largest manufacturers of remote controls, responsible for an estimated 30% global market share in home entertainment remotes.  
Under its Ecolink brand, it also makes home security and automation products such as motion and door/window entry sensors for DIY and professional home security markets and OEMs.

UEI makes numerous products that use Zigbee, Bluetooth or Wi-Fi technology.  They are a member of the ZigBee Alliance, Bluetooth SIG and Wi-Fi Alliance.

QuickSet Cloud 
QuickSet Cloud is Universal Electronics’ software product family including web services and embedded SDK for simplifying discovery and universal control setup and operation in a smart home.

Acquisitions 
In February 2009, UEI purchased all of Zilog's software & IP assets related to Zilog's universal remote control business, including all ROM code, software, and database of infrared codes. Zilog sold these assets for $31 million cash.

In August 2015, UEI acquired Ecolink Intelligent Technology, a wireless home security and automation specialist. In May 2017, UEI further expanded by acquiring RCS Technology, a pioneer in smart thermostats and energy management.

Honors 
In 2017, National Academy of Television Arts & Sciences awarded UEI a Technology & Engineering Emmy Award for its contribution to "Contextual Voice Navigation for Discovering and Interacting with TV Content."

China Labor 

In October 2021, Reuters published an article in which it suggested that Universal Electronics Inc. employed Uyghur workers at one of its factories in China and that this employment  “[bore] the hallmarks of what one would consider to be forced labor”. While the reporter acknowledge that she never visited the facility nor spoke to any of company official in China or any of the  workers, a UEI spokesperson did confirm that UEI had indeed hired approximately 356 Uyghurs to work at the specific factory in China through a third-party staffing agency.  Notwithstanding the many false statements and resulting implications, the company took swift and decisive action. First, the company commissioned two independent audits.  One specifically focused on the labor practices of the staffing agency and the second on general working conditions and operations of the factory in question.  Through these audits, the company confirmed that there was no evidence of forced labor and that these workers were treated in the same humane way as all other workers at the factory and that they received the same (above minimum) remuneration as their co-workers with similar employ.  After these audits were concluded, and in consultation with customers and labor practice advisory experts, the company terminated its relationship with the third-party staffing agency, which resulted in all Uyghur workers leaving the factory. During this process, the company provided assistance to the workers in the form of additional severance (above that which was required by law) and transportation to the destination of their choice  .Since then, management has implemented additional measures to further strengthen their labor practices and processes, which included becoming member of the Responsible Business Alliance.

References

Electronics companies of the United States
Consumer electronics